Inhambane Airport is an airport in Jangamo District, Inhambane Province, Mozambique .

The airport is operational Monday to Friday from 07:00 to 17:00, Saturdays from 08:00 to 17:00, open by advance request on Sundays.  Customs and Immigration can be organised in advance of arrivals.  Fees and taxes apply. There is currently only fuel available on request if prearranged in advance.

Airlines and destinations

See also
 Inhambane
 Tofo

References

External links
 Inhambane Information

Airports in Mozambique
Buildings and structures in Inhambane Province